The Light At The End Of The Tunnel Is A Train is the debut studio album from Whitey, featuring the singles  "Y.U.H.2.B.M.2," "Leave Them All Behind," and "Non Stop." The album was released in the UK on March 21, 2005 through 1234 Records, and was released in the US a year later through Dim Mak Records.

Track listing 

Notes
 "Y.U.H.2.B.M.2" is known as "Why You Have To Be Me" for its single release.
 "Intro/In The Limelight" and "A Walk In The Dark/Reprise" have shortened titles in some releases

Personnel 
Credits adapted from the liner notes

Whitey 
 Nathan J Whitey - songwriter, vocals, programmer, guitar, bass, organ, vibraphone, violin, drums, xylophone, producer, artwork

Additional musicians 
 Sean McLusky - drums 
 Julian-Shah Tayler - guitar 
 Patrick Walden - guitar 
 Wildcat Will - drums

Technical 
 Paul Harrison - engineer 
 Robert Harder - co-producer, engineer 
 Paul Spence - engineer

Artwork 
 Patrick Duffy - art direction, design
 Chris Graham - artwork

References

2005 debut albums
Whitey (musician) albums
Dim Mak Records albums